Pape Alioune Diop (died 26 September 2012) was a Senegalese football coach who managed the Senegalese national team at the 1986 African Cup of Nations.

Diop also managed Senegalese clubs ASC Diaraf, ASC Jeanne d'Arc and ASFA Dakar.

References

2012 deaths
Year of birth missing
Senegalese football managers
Senegal national football team managers
Deaths from Alzheimer's disease
1986 African Cup of Nations managers
Sportspeople from Thiès
Deaths from dementia in Senegal